The 2013–14 Portland State Vikings men's basketball team represented Portland State University during the 2013–14 NCAA Division I men's basketball season. The Vikings, led by fifth year head coach Tyler Geving, played their home games at the Peter Stott Center and were members of the Big Sky Conference. They finished the season 17–15, 11–9 in Big Sky play to finish in a tie for fifth place. They advanced to the semifinals of the Big Sky Conference tournament where they lost to North Dakota. They were invited to the CollegeInsider.com Tournament where they lost in the first round to San Diego.

Roster

Schedule

|-
!colspan=9 style="background:#02461D; color:#FFFFFF;"| Exhibition

|-
!colspan=9 style="background:#02461D; color:#FFFFFF;"| Regular season

|-
!colspan=9 style="background:#02461D; color:#FFFFFF;"| Big Sky tournament

|-
!colspan=9 style="background:#02461D; color:#FFFFFF;"| CIT

References

Portland State Vikings men's basketball seasons
Portland State
Portland State
Port
Port